Margareta Mureşan (born 13 March 1950 in Cluj-Napoca) is a Romanian chess player, who was mainly active in the 1980s.

She has won the women's Romanian Chess Championship three times.

She played no. 1 board for the Romanian women's team which won the silver medal at the 25th Chess Olympiad and the bronze medal at the next 2 Olympiads.

She twice made it to the Interzonal stage of the Women's World Chess Championship and once in Candidates matches.

External links 
chess games

Romanian female chess players
Living people
1950 births
Sportspeople from Cluj-Napoca